The Poplar Bluff Tigers were a minor league baseball team based Poplar Bluff, Missouri. In 1908, the Tigers played briefly as members of the Class D level Arkansas State League. During the 1908 season, Poplar Bluff relocated to Brinkley, Arkansas and became the Brinkley Infants for the remainder of the season. The Tigers hosted minor league home games at Sportsman's Park. The combined Poplar Bluff/Brinkley team finished last in the Arkansas State League standings.

History
Minor league baseball began in Poplar Bluff, Missouri when the 1908 Poplar Bluff Tigers began play as members of the six–team Class D level Arkansas State League. 

After beginning league play on April 20, 1908, the Poplar Bluff Tigers lost their first five games. It was reported that the Poplar Bluff franchise was having financial difficulties. Manager Al Sullivan left the team two weeks into the season and Arkansas State League president Thomas Craighead took over operations of the team.

The Poplar Bluff franchise relocated to Brinkley, Arkansas during the season. On June 8, 1908, the franchise relocated with a 16–58 record and became the Brinkley Infants for the remainder of the 1908 season.

The 1908 team continued play and compiled a 12–21 record playing as the Brinkley Infants. Combined, the Poplar Bluff/Brinkley team placed last in the standings in their one season of minor league play. The team ended the 1908 Arkansas State League season with an overall record of 28–79, to place 6th in the Arkansas State League standings. Poplar Bluff/Brinkley finished 45.5 games behind the 1st place Hot Springs Giants and were managed by Al Sullivan and Lee Dawkins. The Helena Ponies (67–48), Newport Pearl Diggers (65–44), Pine Bluff Pine Knotts (51–61) and Argenta Shamrocks (49–68) finished ahead of Poplar Bluff/Brinkley in the final standings.

In 1909, the Arkansas State League expanded to eight teams, but the Brinkley franchise did not return to the league.

Poplar Bluff, Missouri (and Brinkley, Arkansas) has not hosted other minor league teams.

The ballparks
The 1908 Poplar Bluff Tigers played minor league home games at Sportsman's Park. The park is still in use today as a public park in partnership with the Missouri Department of Conservation. The park is located on Business Highway 60E, Poplar Bluff, Missouri.

After the team moved to Brinkley, Arkansas the Brinkley Infants played home games at Brinkley City Park. Brinkley City Park is still in use as a public park. The park is located at 211 West Cypress Street, Brinkley, Arkansas.

Timeline

Year–by–year record

Notable alumni
Wild Bill Luhrsen (1908)
Ray Rolling (1808)

See also
Poplar Bluff (minor league baseball) playersBrinkley (minor league baseball) players

References

External links
Baseball Reference
Poplar Bluff, Missouri sports teams on StatsCrew.com Stats Crew

Defunct minor league baseball teams
Sports teams in Missouri
Baseball teams established in 1908
Baseball teams disestablished in 1908
Defunct baseball teams in Missouri
Professional baseball teams in Missouri
Butler County, Missouri
Arkansas State League teams